The Man in the Background (Dutch:De man op den achtergrond) is a 1922 Dutch-German silent film directed by Ernst Winar.

Cast
 Eduard Ijdo – Geoffrey Gill
 Adolphe Engers – Willem Hendriks
 Paula de Waart – Willem Hendriks' vrouw
 Koba Kinsbergen – Mariska
 Ernst Becker – Lord Ruthven
 Herma van Delden – Mauds zus
 Coen Hissink – Count Stanislaus Larinski
 Hans Lindegg – Werner
 Paul Rehkopf
 Erich Walter – Count Otto von Trepow
 Stefanie Hantzsch – Agnes von Trepow
 Victor Colani – Bernhard von Trepow
 Eduard van Meghen – Von Harder
 Fritz Epstein – Peter
 Erika Unruh – Käthe

External links 
 

1922 films
Dutch black-and-white films
Films of the Weimar Republic
Films directed by Ernst Winar
Dutch silent feature films
German silent feature films
German black-and-white films
1920s German films